Colonel Katherine Amelia Towle (April 30, 1898 – March 1, 1986) was the second director of the United States Marine Corps Women's Reserve (USMCWR) and the first director of Women Marines.

Biography

Towle was born in Towle, California on April 30, 1898. (The town was named after her paternal grandfather and uncles who settled there in the 1850s.) She moved with her family to Berkeley, California in 1908. She graduated with honors from University of California, Berkeley in 1920, then later earned a Master's degree in political science in 1935.

Marine Corps career
She came to the Marine Corps from UC Berkeley in 1943. Her first assignment with the new women's component was even before public announcement of the establishment of the Women's Reserve on February 13, 1943. She was named Women's Reserve (WR) representative for Women's Recruit Depot in the Bronx, with the rank of captain, USMCWR, (with date of rank February 24, 1943).

Colonel Towle was named director when her predecessor, Colonel Ruth Cheney Streeter, retired on December 7, 1945. She served in that capacity until June 1946. In August of the same year, when the Women's Reserve was deactivated, Colonel Towle returned to the University of California as assistant dean of women.

Again, after the Congress had authorized the acceptance of women into the regular armed services, the Marine Corps called upon Colonel Towle to direct this organization. On November 4, 1948, she returned to the corps to become the first director of Women Marines after they were constituted a regular component.

In 1950 the Marine Corps contracted the fashion design house of Mainbocher to design new uniforms for the Women Marines. The prototype of the first Marine Corps women's evening dress uniform was tailored expressly for Colonel Towle.  It was first worn in public at the 175th anniversary Marine Corps Birthday Ball in 1950. The uniform included a red tiara with gold embellishments. As another design of evening dress uniform was eventually adopted, Colonel Towle's evening dress uniform was a "one of a kind." This uniform is now in the museum collection of Artillery Company of Newport in Newport, Rhode Island.

Colonel Towle served as director of Women Marines until her retirement on April 30, 1953.

Her military awards included the Legion of Merit, Navy Commendation Medal, American Campaign Medal and World War Two Victory Medal. Eight days before Colonel Towle's retirement, President Eisenhower created the National Defense Service Medal retroactive to June 27, 1950. She was, thus, eligible for the medal but it is uncertain if she was ever formally awarded it.

University dean
After retiring from the Marine Corps, Towle was succeeded by Colonel Julia Hamblet. Towle was later associated with the University of California at Berkeley in various capacities: as dean of women from 1953 to 1960; as assistant dean of students from 1960 to 1965; as dean of students, 1965–66; and later as dean of students, emeritus. She was the first female to serve as dean of students.

Death
Towle died on March 2, 1986, at her home in California at the age of 87.

Legacy
In 2005, a new residence hall at U.C. Berkeley was named after Colonel Towle (Katherine A. Towle Hall).

Awards
Legion of Merit
Navy Commendation Medal
American Campaign Medal
World War Two Victory Medal
National Defense Service Medal
Navy Commendation Medal (originally known as the Navy Commendation)

Navy Commendation Medal Citation

THE SECRETARY OF THE NAVY
WASHINGTON
The Secretary of the Navy takes pleasure in commending LIEUTENANT COLONEL KATHERINE A. TOWLE, UNITED STATES MARINE CORPS WOMEN'S RESERVE, for service as set forth in the following

CITATION: 
"For meritorious service during the entire period of the growth and development of the United States Marine Corps Women's Reserve. She was at once placed in a position of responsibility and succeeding assignments have broadened her field of usefulness. She has constantly demonstrated superior qualities of judgment, tact and leadership and has commanded the respect and confidence of her colleagues. By her outstanding performance of duty, Lieutenant Colonel Towle has contributed greatly to the development of the Marine Corps Women's Reserve. Her conduct was in keeping with the highest traditions of the United States Naval Service."

A copy of this citation has been made a part of Lieutenant Colonel Towle's official record and she is hereby authorized to wear the Commendation Ribbon.
/s/ JAMES FORRESTAL Secretary of the Navy OFFICIAL COPY [1945]

References

Further reading

External links
Encyclopædia Britannica Article
1967 Interviews with Colonel Towle

1898 births
1986 deaths
People from Placer County, California
Military personnel from California
Recipients of the Legion of Merit
United States Marine Corps colonels
UC Berkeley College of Letters and Science alumni
University of California, Berkeley faculty
20th-century American women
20th-century American people
Marine Corps Women's Reserve personnel